The Middle European Cooperation in Statistical Physics (MECO) is an international conference on statistical physics which takes place every year in a different country of Europe. MECO evolved in the early 1970s with the aim of bridging the gap between the communities of scientists from the Eastern and Western parts of Europe, separated as they were by the iron curtain. Since then, MECO conferences have become the yearly nomadic reference meetings for the community of scientists who are active in the field of Statistical Physics in the broader sense, including modern interdisciplinary applications to biology,  Finance , information theory, and quantum computation.

History 
The MECO conferences were deliberately created as an attempt to establish and maintain an exchange between scientists in the fields of statistical and condensed matter physics from Western and Eastern countries, overcoming the hurdles of the "iron curtain". In 1972, the Hungarian theorist Peter Szépfalusy started activities about  organising a meeting of physicists from middle European countries, who worked in the area of critical phenomena.  Another meeting took place in Budapest in the following year and the first MECO conference was organized 1974 in Vienna. Founding fathers of the conference included
physicists, experimentalists as well as theorists, doing, especially, research on ferroelectricity, like Robert Blinc from Jugoslavia and K. Alex Müller from
Switzerland. 

In order to develop this concept in the mid 70’s and 80’s of the 20th century, the original intention was to have each year a conference, alternating on either side of the iron curtain. If it took place on the Eastern side, scientists from the communist countries could easier obtain permission to travel to the conference site. In addition, it was deemed essential to provide free (or very cheap) accommodation for participants and the low cost of attending MECO was also useful after the fall of the iron curtain, due to the resulting difficult economic situation in the Eastern part of Europe in the 90’s of the last century.

In this way, the organizers of the early MECO conferences succeeded, perhaps for the first time, to bring numerous scientists, despite the political difficulties, together and to create a lively atmosphere of fruitful scientific exchange. This has greatly helped to establish many collaborations which lasted up to the present time, when, partly thanks to the European Union, many more such collaborations have become possible. The ties created by MECO, however, still are useful to help scientific exchange, even though the scientific emphasis has changed from the traditional fields of statistical mechanics and solid state physics to interdisciplinary themes of current interest as well.

In  February 2022 the Ukrainian member of MECO was attacked by Russian military forces. Ukraine's President Zelenskyy, said a new iron curtain is coming.  This situation disposed the MECO advisory board to the following Statement:

"The advisory board of MECO is shocked by the actions of the leadership of Russia against Ukraine – a MECO member.  This act of violence goes against the values and aspirations of Europe’s scientists who, with the creation of MECO in 1974, sought to overcome the iron curtain that divided Eastern and Western countries. 

The invasion of a free country is a brutal attack on the freedom of all nations, communities, and individuals. MECO’s aim is to enable scientific freedom for the academic community as an essential part of peaceful cooperation between countries. Academic freedom is only possible by respecting national freedom. The advisory board therefore calls on the academic community worldwide to maintain and support these values by condemning the actions of Russia’s leadership and calling for withdrawal of Russian forces from Ukraine with immediate effect."

Past conferences 
MECO usually gathers from 100 to 150 scientists almost every year. Below is the list of the past conference and their locations. Green color denotes the ones which took place on west side of iron curtain, red color - those on east. Such separation disappeared naturally after fall of USSR in 1991.

Future conferences 
MECO47 will take place in Erice (Italy) on June 12-16, 2022 in a hybrid format.

References

External links 

  Physicists with complex systems are working far away from equilibrium at the international 34th Conference MECO34 in Leipzig.
  Symposium: MECO 35 - Lorraine
  MECO statistical physics forum will take place in Lviv for the first time

  Article about MECO 36 in student newspaper
 MECO38 in Trieste, Italy
 41st conference of the Middle European Cooperation in Statistical Physics (MECO)
Physics conferences